Adriana-Gabriela Crăciun (née Țăcălie; born 29 January 1989) is a Romanian handballer who plays for  SCM Craiova.

Achievements 
Liga Naţională:
Winner: 2007, 2008, 2009, 2010, 2011
Runner-up: 2014
Romanian Cup:
Winner: 2007, 2011
Finalist: 2013

EHF Cup Winners' Cup                           
Winner: 2007
EHF Champions Trophy                           
Winner: 2007
EHF Champions League:
Winner: 2012 
Finalist: 2010
Montenegrin Championship:
Winner: 2012
Montenegrin Cup:
Winner: 2012
EHF Cup: 
Semifinalist: 2015

References
 

1989 births
Living people
Sportspeople from Slatina, Romania
Romanian female handball players 
SCM Râmnicu Vâlcea (handball) players
Expatriate handball players
Romanian expatriates in Montenegro
Romanian expatriates in France